Einar Rose (27 January 1898 – 3 February 1979) was a Norwegian actor, revue artist, singer and restaurant keeper. He was among Norway's most popular singers, and recorded more than 300 songs between 1927 and 1941. He made his debut in the revue Regnbuen på Mayol in 1925. He played at the revue theatre Chat Noir from 1926, and was artistic director at Chat Noir from 1936. Among his best known song performances are "Svigermor og Evensen og kjerringa og jeg", "Sol ute, sol inne", "Ola var fra Sandefjord" and "Nå går'n på gummisåler".

References

1898 births
1979 deaths
Musicians from Oslo
Norwegian male stage actors
Norwegian male comedians
Norwegian restaurateurs
20th-century Norwegian male actors
20th-century Norwegian male singers
20th-century Norwegian singers
20th-century comedians